San Clemente is a comune (municipality) in the Province of Rimini, but before 1992 in the Province of Forlì, in the Italian region Emilia-Romagna, located about  southeast of Bologna, about  southeast of Forlì and about  south of Rimini.

Main sights
Malatesta castle, whose walls include part of the town.
Fortified Malatesta villa at Castelleale

References

Cities and towns in Emilia-Romagna
Castles in Italy